"St. Patrick's Day" is the nineteenth episode of the sixth season of the American comedy series The Office and the show's 119th episode overall. It was written by Jonathan Hughes and directed by Randall Einhorn.

In this episode, Jo Bennett and Michael clash during Jo's last day at the Scranton branch, when Jo makes the whole office stay late at work, which angers the branch especially since it is St. Patrick's Day. Meanwhile, Dwight has converted his, Jim's, and Pam's desks into one "megadesk", which frustrates Jim when he returns from paternity leave. Meanwhile, Andy and Erin's first date is interrupted when Erin goes home sick, so Andy pretends to be sick as well to go to her house.

Synopsis
Jo Bennett (Kathy Bates) is spending her last day at the Scranton office, and Michael Scott (Steve Carell) thinks he has earned her favor after some small talk. However, when Jo opens up the floor to suggestions on how to improve business, Darryl Philbin (Craig Robinson) offers an idea on how to improve shipping for both paper and printers. As a result, Jo allows Darryl to take Jim's old office. Michael tries once again to earn Jo's favor with some small talk and by scheduling a vacation to her home state of Florida, but Jo berates him for wasting time, and Michael cancels his flights. The rest of the office is unhappy when Jo forces them to stay late, as she has an unpredictable work schedule. Michael is particularly upset, as he made plans to meet Todd Packer (David Koechner) at a bar for St. Patrick's Day. The employees try to make multiple breaks for it, but fail. Michael is finally direct with Jo, and tells her he's allowing his employees to leave. She complies, showing the first hint of respect for Michael. Michael and Todd Packer meet the rest of the employees at the bar.

Andy Bernard (Ed Helms) and Erin Hannon (Ellie Kemper) are set to have their first date. However, Erin is sick and Jo sends her home. Andy, wanting to see Erin, feigns being sick so he can leave too. He visits Erin at home, and they watch TV together. However, their time is interrupted when he meets her foster brother (Sean Davis), who makes Andy sit on the chair while he sits next to Erin on the couch. Erin and her foster brother engage in physically intimate behavior, so Andy begins to suspect that the foster siblings are romantically involved. When he prepares to leave, however, Erin gives Andy a lingering kiss on the cheek.

While Jim Halpert (John Krasinski) and Pam Halpert (Jenna Fischer) are gone on parental leave, Dwight Schrute (Rainn Wilson) arranges Jim's and Pam's desks with his into one "Megadesk". When he returns from leave, Jim puts the desks back properly, but Dwight continually reforms his "Megadesk" whenever Jim is not around. In a bid to preserve "Megadesk", he tells Jim about how he and his cousin Mose never saw their fathers when they were young. He then plays an obnoxious rendition of "Cat's in the Cradle" on the computer while Jim is on a sales call. Jim (surprised that Dwight's cheap manipulations are working) wishes he was at home with his newborn daughter.

Dwight attempts to get out of work by telling Jo he has a meeting with a client, but Jim beats him to it. This allows Jim to leave, forcing Dwight to go back to his desk. At the end of the episode, Dwight comes in to work the next day to find that Jim had rearranged the desks into a "Quad-Desk"; one desk on top of the other two desks, with a little space in between the two bottom desks where he put Dwight's computer, phone and nameplate.

Reception
In its original American broadcast, "St. Patrick's Day" was watched by 7.51 million viewers, with a 3.8 rating and an 11 share in the 18–49 demographic.

References

External links
 "St. Patrick's Day" at NBC.com
 

2010 American television episodes
The Office (American season 6) episodes
Saint Patrick's Day television episodes